PP-263 Rahim Yar Khan-IX is a Constituency of Provincial Assembly of Punjab.

General elections 2013

General elections 2008

See also
 PP-262 Rahim Yar Khan-VIII
 PP-264 Rahim Yar Khan-X

References

External links
 Election commission Pakistan's official website
 Awazoday.com check result
 Official Website of Government of Punjab

Provincial constituencies of Punjab, Pakistan